Brynjulf Larsen Bergslien (12 November 1830 – 19 September 1898) was a noted Norwegian sculptor.

Background
Bergslien was born in Voss in Hordaland county, Norway. He was a son of Lars Bergeson Bergslien and Kirsten Knutsdotter Gjelle. He was a brother of noted  painter and master artist Knud Bergslien. In 1861 he married Johanne Christine Tønnesen (1842–1930).

Career
He studied under Jens Adolf Jerichau and Herman Wilhelm Bissen in Copenhagen between 1853 and 1861. 
In 1861 he settled in Kristiania (now Oslo) where he ran his own engraving workshop. Bergslien also operated an artist's training studio. Among his students were Sigvald Asbjornsen  and Gustav Vigeland.

He sculpted several prominently placed statues in Oslo, including that of King Charles John of Norway and Sweden (1875) at Slottsplassen in front of the Royal Palace. He was also noted for the statue  of f Henrik Wergeland (1881) at Eidsvolls plass . Other notable statues include that of Peter Christian Asbjørnsen (1891) at St. Hanshaugen Park.

Bergslien Park
Brynjulf Bergslien  and Knud Bergslien were the uncles of painter and sculptor Nils Bergslien. Monuments honoring the three famous Bergslien artists now exist in Bergslien Park located in Voss, Hordaland, Norway.

References

1830 births
1898 deaths
Norwegian sculptors
People from Voss
Norwegian expatriates in Denmark
19th-century Norwegian sculptors
Burials at the Cemetery of Our Saviour
Order of Saint Olav